The Sweden national baseball team is the national baseball team of Sweden. The team competes in the bi-annual European Baseball Championship, where Sweden on two occasions has claimed the bronze medal.

The team's manager is Jim Sasko.

History 
Baseball has been played in Sweden since at least 1904, but it wasn't until 1952 that the first game was played by a national team. In that year Sweden played against Finland and lost, 4–9.

Ten years later Sweden's national federation became members of the Confederation of European Baseball, and the national team took part in its first European Baseball Championship, where Sweden lost all four games by a combined score of 16–55. In the next tournament two years later Sweden managed to win its first ever game in the European Championship, 5–0 over France.

Sweden played its first official game on home soil in 1974, a 9–1 win over Great Britain in the qualifications for the European Championship that were held the following year.

In 1981 Sweden took home bronze at the European Championships in the Netherlands (only four teams took part). This achievement was duplicated in 1993, when Sweden hosted the tournament for the first time.

Sweden played in the World Cup for the first time in 1994 and also participated in 2005 and 2009, but always finished near the bottom. In 2009 Sweden was one of eight host countries.

International tournament results

Olympic games 

Sweden played host to the first ever international exhibition baseball match to be held at the Olympic Games. The players of the Västerås Baseball Club represented their home nation in the game against a team composed of members of the United States Olympic delegation. In addition, three pitchers and a catcher were recruited from the American delegation to help fill the Swedish roster.

Sweden has not succeeded in qualifying during any of the years the sport has been officially included in the Olympics, nor has it participated in any further baseball exhibitions at the Olympics since 1912.

World Cup 
Sweden participated in the World Cup on three occasions.

 1994: 15th (of 16)
 2005: 16th (of 18)
 2009: 19th (of 22)

European Baseball Championship 
Sweden has participated in the European Baseball Championship on 29 occasions, every time since 1962.

References 

National baseball teams in Europe
Baseball
Baseball in Sweden